The Presidio–Ojinaga International Rail Bridge (also known as the Presidio Rail Bridge or the Puente Ferro Carril Ojinaga) is an international bridge that crosses the Rio Grande (Río Bravo) between the cities of Presidio, Texas, and Ojinaga, Chihuahua, on the United States-Mexico border. 

It is owned by the Mexican government and the state of Texas Department of Transportation. It is privately operated under a lease by Ferromex subsidiary Texas Pacifico Transportation. 

The Presidio–Ojinaga International Rail Bridge has been out of service following fire damage on 29 February 2008. Reconstruction started in 2018. Reopening to cross-border rail service is expected to begin after a U.S. Customs and Border Protection (CBP) station has been installed.

See also
 List of crossings of the Rio Grande
 Presidio–Ojinaga International Bridge the road bridge that lies nearby

References

International bridges in Texas
International bridges in Chihuahua (state)
Buildings and structures in Presidio County, Texas
Railway bridges in Mexico
Railroad bridges in Texas
Transportation in Presidio County, Texas